Joel Jordison (born March 11, 1978) is a Canadian curler from Moose Jaw, Saskatchewan. Jordison currently skips his own team from Moose Jaw.

Career
Jordison is a former Saskatchewan junior curling champion, having won the title with current third Jason Ackerman.

With third Scott Bitz, second Aryn Schmidt, and lead Dean Hicke, Jordison became a men's provincial champion with a win at the 2009 SaskTel Tankard with a win over Pat Simmons, which broke Simmons' streak of four consecutive provincial titles. With this win, Jordison won the right to represent Saskatchewan at the Brier that same year, where they finished with a 3–8 win–loss record. Jordison and his team also played at the 2009 qualifier to the Canadian Olympic Curling Trials, but failed to win a game.

Jordison joined Steve Laycock in 2011 after a partnership with Jason Jacobson in the previous season to replace Simmons, who left Laycock's team to join Kevin Koe. After one year with Laycock, Jordison reunited with Ackerman to form a new team with Brent Goeres and Curtis Horwath.

On the World Curling Tour, Jordison has seen some success, with some Grand Slam appearances and runner-up finishes in World Curling Tour events. He has won one event to date, the 2007 Whites Drug Store Classic.

Teams

References

External links
 

1978 births
Curlers from Saskatchewan
Living people
Sportspeople from Moose Jaw
Canada Cup (curling) participants